The 2020–21 EWHL season was the seventeenth season of the European Women's Hockey League (EWHL) since the league’s creation in 2004. It was the second season since the league's administrative and organizational duties were transferred to the Hungarian Ice Hockey Federation (HIHF/MJSZ).

KMH Budapest played a perfect season in which they won all sixteen games to claim the regular season title. KMH held steady in the playoffs, shutting out their opponents in both games on the way to winning the team's third consecutive EWHL Championship title. 

KMH Budapest players also dominated the league‘s individual statistics. KMH forward Hayley Williams narrowly beat out teammate Alexandra Huszák as top point scorer in the regular season, with 9 goals and 22 assists for 31 points in fifteen games played. Huszák was the EWHL top goal scorer, netting 18 goals in 13 games played. Eighteen year old Zsófia Tóth topped the goaltender statistics with a stellar .972 save percentage and 0.83 goals against average.

Teams

Regular season 
The regular season began on 26 September 2020 and ended on 21 February 2021. MAC Budapest were the regular season champions after playing a perfect season, in which they won all sixteen games in regulation time.

Player statistics

Scoring leaders 
The following players led the league in points at the conclusion of the regular season on 21 February 2021.

Goaltenders 
The following goaltenders lead the league in save percentage at the conclusion of the season on 21 February 2021, while starting at least one third of matches.

Playoffs

Semifinals

Bronze medal game

Championship final

Player statistics

Scoring leaders 
The following players led the league in playoff points.

Goaltenders 
The following goaltenders recorded time in net during the playoffs.

Awards 

 Best goaltender: Zsófia Tóth, KMH Budapest
 Top goal scorer: Alexandra Huszák, KMH Budapest
 Top point scorer: Hayley Williams, KMH Budapest

2020–21 All-Star Team 
 Goaltender: Selma Luggin, EHV Sabres 
 Defenceman: Franciska Kiss-Simon, KMH Budapest
 Defenceman: Tatiana Ištocyová, ŠKP Bratislava
 Winger: Annika Fazokas, DEC Salzburg
 Center: Alexandra Huszák, KMH Budapest
 Winger: Fanni Gasparics, KMH Budapest
Sources:

References

External links 
 EWHL official website

Europe, 2020–21
European Women, 2020–21
EWHL
European Women's Hockey League seasons